Modzerowo  is a village in the administrative district of Gmina Włocławek, within Włocławek County, Kuyavian-Pomeranian Voivodeship, in north-central Poland.

The village has a population of 350.

References

Villages in Włocławek County